The Center for Constitutional Rights (CCR) is a progressive non-profit legal advocacy organization based in New York City, New York, in the United States. It was founded in 1966 by Arthur Kinoy, William Kunstler and others particularly to support activists in the implementation of civil rights legislation and to achieve social justice.

CCR has focused on civil liberties and human rights litigation, and activism. Since winning the landmark case in the United States Supreme Court of Rasul v. Bush (2004), establishing the right of detainees at Guantanamo Bay detainment camp to challenge their status in US courts and gain legal representation, it has provided legal assistance to people imprisoned there and gained release for many who were unlawfully held or proven not to be a risk to security.

History

The center, originally the Law Center for Constitutional Rights, was set up to give legal and financial support to lawyers who were representing Civil Rights Movement activists in Mississippi at the height of the struggle against racial segregation and economic injustice. Its founders were Morton Stavis, Arthur Kinoy, Ben Smith and William Kunstler. The Center identified as a "movement support" organization; that is, an organization that concentrated on working with political and social activists to use the courts to promote the activists' work. Cases were chosen to raise public awareness of an issue, generate media attention, and/or energize activists being harassed by local law enforcement in the South. In this regard, the Center differed from more traditional legal non-profits, such as the ACLU, which was more focused on bringing winnable cases in order to extend precedents and develop the law, as well as pursuing First Amendment issues.

The current organization was formed from the merger of the original Center for Constitutional Rights (formed in 1966 by Kunstler, Kinoy, Stavis and Smith) and the Emergency Civil Liberties Committee (ECLC).

Since 9/11, it has been known for bringing a variety of cases challenging the Bush administration's detention, extraordinary rendition, and interrogation practices in the so-called "Global War on Terror". With its president Michael Ratner filing Rasul v. Bush in 2002, this was the first lawsuit to challenge President George W. Bush's wartime detentions at Guantanamo Bay Naval Base in Cuba in the early days of the "war on terror."

It was the first time in history that the Court had ruled against the president on behalf of alleged enemy fighters in wartime. And it was the first of four Supreme Court decisions between 2004 and 2008 that rejected President Bush's assertion of unchecked executive power in the "war on terror."

According to pbs website, primary issues for advocacy and public education include: illegal detentions, particularly with regards to the Guantanamo Bay detainment camp; surveillance and attacks on dissent, which fights the U.S. government's involvement in unlawful surveillance, monitoring and intimidation of activists such as the Black Panthers; criminal justice and mass incarceration, including jail expansions and unjust detentions; corporate and human rights abuse both domestic and international; government abuse of power, primarily encompassing CCR's challenge to the Bush administration's policy of extraordinary rendition; racial, gender and economic justice; and international law and accountability.  In 2005 the organization was recognized with the Domestic Human Rights Award by Global Exchange, in San Francisco.

Activities and litigation

Rasul v. Bush, 215 F. Supp. 2d 55 (2004): CCR represented Guantanamo detainees seeking fair trials and an end to their indefinite imprisonment without charge. The Supreme Court case established precedent for U.S. courts' jurisdiction over the Guantanamo Bay prison camp, affirming detainees' right to habeas corpus review, including legal representation. This right was later putatively revoked when President Bush signed the Military Commissions Act into law. CCR brought many of the same habeas corpus petitioners to the Supreme Court again in Boumediene v. Bush (2008), in which the Supreme Court declared the relevant parts of the MCA unconstitutional and restored the rights won in Rasul. (see below)
Al Odah v. United States, 127 S. Ct. 3067 (2007): the latest in a series of habeas corpus petitions on behalf of people imprisoned at the Guantanamo Bay detention center. The case challenges the Military Commissions system's suitability as a habeas corpus substitute and the legality, in general, of detention at Guantanamo. It was consolidated under Boumediene v. Bush, which was decided by the US Supreme Court in 2008, ruling that the MCA was unconstitutional and restoring habeas corpus rights established under Rasul v. Bush (2004).
Arar v. Ashcroft, 585 F. 3d 559 (2009): challenges U.S. government's extraordinary rendition policies and highlights the experience of Maher Arar, a Canadian citizen allegedly sent by the United States to be tortured in Syria. He has never been charged, and has been found by the Canadian government not to be involved with terrorism. He and CCR seek an acknowledgment of the U.S.'s alleged involvement and an end to the rendition program.
Abtan v. Blackwater, 611 F.Supp.2d 1 (2009): CCR filed suit on behalf of the civilian victims of the September 16, 2007, Blackwater Baghdad shootings in Nisoor Square, Baghdad, by Blackwater USA's armed contractors. The suit charges that Blackwater "created and fostered a culture of lawlessness amongst its employees, encouraging them to act in the company's financial interests at the expense of innocent human life." Blackwater is also accused of extrajudicial killing and war crimes, assault and battery, wrongful death, intentional and negligent infliction of emotional distress, and negligent hiring, training and supervision.
CCR v. Bush: This lawsuit challenges the constitutionality of the NSA's surveillance of people within the United States without warrant or prior court approval.
Daniels v. City of New York, 291 AD 2d 260 (2002) / Floyd v. City of New York, 739 F. Supp. 2d 376 (2010): This case forced the New York City Police Department to end their practice of stopping and frisking people solely on the basis of their race or national origin. The case also highlighted the practices of the NYPD Street Crimes Unit (responsible for the 1999 shooting of Amadou Diallo), leading to its disbandment. The case's settlement created an internal audit system of officers engaged in stop and frisks, the results of which are turned over to CCR on a quarterly basis. In addition, the settlement required the NYPD to begin "know your rights" public education programs. CCR is working to compel the NYPD to comply with the terms of the settlement.
Estate of Ali Hussamalde Albazzaz v. Blackwater Worldwide: This is a civil suit filed on behalf of the family of an Iraqi man killed by Blackwater personnel. CCR is charging Blackwater Worldwide with war crimes.
Khan v. Bush: This suit is filed on behalf of Majid Khan, a U.S. asylum-holder who was held by the United States in secret detention at a C.I.A. "black site" for three years, after which he was transferred to the Guantanamo Bay detention camp. CCR has filed a habeas corpus submission on his behalf.
Kunstler v. City of New York, 439 F.Supp.2d 327 (2006): This lawsuit charges the New York Police Department with unlawfully arresting allegedly peaceful anti-war protesters and holding them for allegedly excessively long periods of time.
Mamani v. Sanchez de Lozada / Mamani v. Sanchez Berzain, 636 F.Supp.2d 1326 (2009): These two suits have been filed against the former President of Bolivia, Gonzalo Daniel Sánchez de Lozada Sánchez Bustamante and former Minister of Defense, Jose Carlos Sánchez Berzaín for their alleged roles in the deaths of civilians during popular protests against the government of Bolivia in September and October 2003.
Matar v. Dichter, 500 F. Supp. 2d 284 (2007): CCR presented a federal class action lawsuit against the former Director of Israel's General Security Service (GSS), Avi Dichter, on behalf of Palestinians killed or injured in a 2002 "targeted killing" air strike in Gaza. It charged him with extrajudicial killing, war crimes and other gross human rights violations. The case was dismissed, and the dismissal upheld on appeal.
Saleh v. Titan, 361 F. Supp. 2d 1152 (2005):
Saleh is a federal class action lawsuit against Titan and CACI International Incorporated, contractors who provided interrogation services at Abu Ghraib. The lawsuit accuses the contractors of cruel and humiliating treatment of prisoners during interrogations.

Turkmen v. Ashcroft: This suit, filed on behalf of a class of Muslim, South Asian, and Arab non-citizens, is a class action civil rights lawsuit contesting their being swept up by the INS and FBI in a racial profiling dragnet following 9/11.
United States v. City of New York (formerly Vulcan Society v. City of New York): This is an Equal Employment Opportunity Commission charge filed by CCR on behalf of the Vulcan Society, an organization of Black firefighters in New York City. The lawsuit charges the Fire Department of New York with discriminatory hiring practices.
Wiwa v. Royal Dutch Petroleum, 626 F.Supp.2d 377 (2009), Wiwa v. Anderson, and Wiwa v. Shell Petroleum Development Company: These are three lawsuits focusing on the human rights abuses against the Ogoni people in Nigeria by officers of corporations related to petroleum production. They are being brought against the Royal Dutch Petroleum Company and Shell Transport and Trading Company (Royal Dutch/Shell), the head of its Nigerian operation, and Royal Dutch/Shell's Nigerian subsidiary for their complicity in the abuses.
Zalita v. Bush, 127 S. Ct. 2159 (2007): This case forwards a habeas corpus petition for Al Qassim, a Libyan refugee detained in Guantanamo for nearly six years. It challenges the U.S. government plan to transfer him to his native country despite his risk of torture and persecution there.
International Criminal Court Complaint, 2011 On September 13, 2011, attorneys from the Center for Constitutional Rights and leaders of SNAP, the Survivors Network of those Abused by Priests, formally filed a complaint with the International Criminal Court (ICC) charging top Vatican officials for tolerating and enabling the concealment of rape and child sex crimes worldwide. At least 20,000 pages of reports, policy papers, and crime evidence by Catholic clergy supplemented the complaint.
The Amicus Brief in Ragbir v. Holder (2011) The Amicus Brief in Ragbir v. Holder was submitted on May 23, 2011. Amici are several community, immigrant justice, and civil rights organizations who argue that the Second Circuit interfered with Ragbir's right to introduce relevant evidence. The Second Circuit wrongfully did not remand Ragbir v. Holder to the Board of Immigration Appeals to apply broader evidentiary standards established in the Nijhawan v. Holder case.
Brown, et al. v. Snyder, et al.  (2011) This June 22, 2011 case was filed on behalf 28 Michigan residents, and it effectively challenges the Emergency Manager law and Local Government and School Fiscal Accountability Act under the State Supreme court of Michigan.  The amended complaint, filed by the CCR on September 14, 2011, challenged the constitutionality of the application of the Emergency Manager law.
Civic Association of the Deaf of New York City, Inc. v. Rudolph Giuliani, et al. (1995) When New York City introduced a plan to remove fire alarm boxes and replace them with payphones, the Civic Association of the Deaf of New York City filed this suit under the Americans with Disabilities Act to block that action because pay phones are not easily accessible to the deaf or the hard of hearing. This federal class action lawsuit resulted in a victory for the Plaintiffs.  When the New York City Fire Department and the City of New York requested that the court modify or dispose of the injunction in June 2010, the court again ruled in favor of the Civic Association of the Deaf of New York City on August 15, 2011.
Doe, et al. v. Jindal, et al.  (2011) On February 16, 2011, the CCR filed a suit that challenged the registration of persons convicted of "Crime Against Nature" on the state sex offenders list.  The defendants in this case were several Louisiana state officials.  On October 31, 2011, the CCR moved for a Summary Judgement.
Amicus Brief in Glik v. Cunniffe, et al.  (2011) On January 25, 2011, CCR submitted an amicus brief on behalf of Glik and several Copwatch groups.  The essential argument is that recording police activities by individuals or organizations within a community is protected by the First Amendment.  In September 2011, the judge ruled in favor of Glik stating that his First Amendment rights had been violated.
Aref, et al. v. Holder, et al. (2010) This case, filed on March 30, 2010, challenged policies and conditions of experimental state prisons in Indiana and Illinois. One year later, the court partially dismissed the case, but allowed the CCR to pursue procedural due process and retaliation claims.

Notable cases

Dombrowski v. Pfister, 380 US 479 (1965): The CCR's first major case was a successful suit against the Louisiana Un-American Activities Committee to challenge the use of state anti-subversion laws to intimidate civil rights workers. CCR won the case in the Supreme Court, which ruled that such intimidation had a "chilling effect" on First Amendment rights and was therefore unconstitutional.
Chicago 7, (1969): CCR attorneys William Kunstler and Leonard Weinglass defended the "Chicago 8," a group of social movement figures arrested following the 1968 Democratic National Convention demonstrations and consequent police repression. The eight defendants: including David Dellinger, Rennie Davis, Tom Hayden, Abbie Hoffman, Jerry Rubin, and Bobby Seale, were anti-war, civil rights and human rights activists, and Students for a Democratic Society and Black Panther Party members. The eight were found not guilty of their conspiracy charges, but five were found guilty of crossing state lines to incite a riot. The Center appealed and ultimately overturned these charges, based on the judge's bias and the refusal of the court to screen jurors for possible cultural and/or racial bias.
Abramowicz v. Lefkowitz, (1972): Abramowicz challenged New York state laws that restricted abortion, and served as a model for challenges to similar laws in other states. This case marks the first instance of challenge to abortion statutes being argued by women plaintiffs in terms of women's right to choice rather than a doctor's right to practice.
Monell v. Department of Social Services, 357 F.Supp. 1051 (1972): This case began as a challenge to New York City's forced maternity leave policies. Its resolution created a precedent that established local government accountability for unconstitutional acts and created the right to obtain damages from municipalities in such cases. Since 1978, this precedent has been used by lawyers and non-profits as a tool to challenge police misconduct, civil rights violations, and other local unconstitutional acts.
United States v. Banks and Means (Wounded Knee), (1974)
Filártiga v. Peña-Irala, 630 F. 2d 876 (1980): Filártiga established a precedent for the use of the Alien Tort Statute to allow foreign victims of human rights abuses to seek justice in U.S. courts. CCR represented the family of Joelito Filártiga, the son of a left-wing Paraguayan dissident who had been tortured and killed by Paraguayan police. The precedent created by this case has facilitated subsequent international human rights cases, including Doe v. Karadzic and Doe v. Unocal. These cases have established that multinational corporations and other non-state actors can be held responsible for their complicity in human rights violations.
Crumsey v. Justice Knights of the Ku Klux Klan, (1982):
Paul v. Avril, (1994): In 1991, on behalf of six Haitian political activists, including Evans Paul, Mayor of Port-au-Prince, and under the Alien Tort Statute, the CCR sued former military dictator Prosper Avril for human rights violations. The suit sought compensation for damages that the plaintiffs suffered under Avril's rule. In November 1993, CCR attorneys moved for a default judgment. In July 1994, in an unprecedented decision in which a Haitian dictator or member of the military was held accountable for human rights abuses, a federal magistrate awarded a $41 million damage judgment to the victims of Prosper Avril.
Doe v. Karadzic, (2000): In 1993, the Center for Constitutional Rights and co-counsel filed a lawsuit seeking compensation for victims and survivors of Serb leader Radovan Kardzic's campaign of genocide and torture in Bosnia. Karadzic defaulted in 1997. On September 25, 2000, the jury decided on a verdict of $4.5 billion.
Rasul v. Bush, 215 F. Supp. 2d 55 (2004): CCR represented Guantanamo detainees seeking fair trials and an end to their indefinite imprisonment without charge. The Supreme Court case established precedent for U.S. courts' jurisdiction over the Guantanamo Bay prison camp, affirming detainees' right to habeas corpus review, including legal representation. This right was later putatively revoked when President Bush signed the Military Commissions Act into law. CCR brought many of the same habeas corpus petitioners to the Supreme Court again in Boumediene v. Bush (2008), in which the Supreme Court declared the relevant parts of the MCA unconstitutional and restored the rights won in Rasul.
Floyd, et al. v. City of New York, et al. (2013) CCR filed a federal class action lawsuit against the New York City Police Department (NYPD) and the City of New York that challenges the NYPD's practices of racial profiling and "stop-and frisk." These NYPD practices had led to a dramatic increase in the number of suspicion-less stop-and-frisks per year in the city, with the majority of stops in communities of color. On August 12, 2013, a federal judge in a historic ruling found the New York City Police Department (NYPD) liable for a pattern and practice of racial profiling and unconstitutional stop-and-frisks. On January 30, 2014, the City agreed to drop its appeal of the ruling and begin the joint remedial process ordered by the court.

See also

 1996 shelling of Qana
 Abu Ghraib torture and prisoner abuse
 American Freedom Campaign
 Baher Azmy
 Bowoto v. Chevron Corp.
 David D. Cole
 Death squad
 European Center for Constitutional and Human Rights
 Ghost detainee
 Guantanamo Bay attorneys
 Guantanamo Bay captives habeas corpus
 Gitanjali S. Gutierrez
 Hamdi v. Rumsfeld
 International Federation of Human Rights
 Jailhouse lawyer
 Movement to impeach George W. Bush
 National Lawyers Guild (NLG)
 The New York Foundation
 Ronald Daniels
 State Secrets Privilege
 Unlawful combatant
 USA PATRIOT Act
 Violent Radicalization and Homegrown Terrorism Prevention Act of 2007
 Winter Soldier Investigation
 Yvonne Wanrow
 Stolen Lives Project

References

External links
 
 Civil Rights Greensboro
 Center for Constitutional Rights Collected Records from Swarthmore College Peace Collection
 Center for Constitutional Rights Records at Tamiment Library and Robert F. Wagner Archives

Government watchdog groups in the United States
Civil liberties advocacy groups in the United States
Legal advocacy organizations in the United States
Organizations established in 1966
1966 establishments in New York City
Criminal defense organizations
Political imprisonment in the United States